The 1952 Florida Gators football team represented the University of Florida during the 1952 college football season. The season was Bob Woodruff's third and most successful as the head coach of the Florida Gators football team. Woodruff's 1952 Florida Gators finished with an overall record of 8–3 and a Southeastern Conference (SEC) record of 3–3, placing sixth among twelve SEC teams.

Before the season
After Sullivan's early departure for the Boston Red Sox left the Gators without a starting quarterback, Doug Dickey advanced from seventh on the Gators' depth chart to starter. The Gators were led by fullback Rick Casares, halfback J. "Pappa" Hall, alternating quarterbacks Doug Dickey and Fred Robinson, and lineman Charlie LaPradd, the Gators' lightest tackle and one of their two captains. Also in the backfield was Buford Long.

Schedule

Season summary

Stetson

Georgia Tech
The national champion Georgia Tech Yellow Jackets  beat Florida on a last-second field goal, 14–17.

Citadel
The Citadel lost to Florida 33–0.

Clemson
Florida blew out  the Clemson Tigers 54–13.

Vanderbilt
On a cold Dudley Field, Florida lost to Vanderbilt 20–13.

Georgia
The Gators dominated rival Georgia 33–0 in Jacksonville, remaining the Gators' largest victory over the Bulldogs for almost forty years. Casares ran for 108 yards, kicked a field goal, and made all the extra points. Even National champion Georgia Tech needed a last-second field goal to defeat the Gators.

Auburn
The defeat of Georgia was followed by another conference victory, 31–21 over Auburn Tigers.

Tennessee
The Tennessee Volunteers defeated the Gators 12–26.

Miami
The Gators had another blowout of the in-state rival Miami Hurricanes 43–6.

Kentucky
Florida defeated the Kentucky Wildcats 27–0.

Postseason
The season ended with the Gators' first appearance in an NCAA-sanctioned bowl game, a closely matched 14–13 Gator Bowl victory over the Tulsa Golden Hurricane on January 1, 1953, in which star fullback Rick Casares kicked the winning extra points for the margin of victory.

LaPradd was All-American.

Notes

References

Bibliography
 
 

Florida
Florida Gators football seasons
Gator Bowl champion seasons
Florida Gators football